Heinemannia festivella is a species of moth of the family Elachistidae. It is found from Sweden in the north, through central Europe to southern Europe. It is also found in Asia Minor, the Middle East and central Asia.

The wingspan is 14–18 mm. Adults are on wing from May to the first half of August.

The food plant is unknown. There are old records for Solidago virgaurea, but these are disputed. In central Asia, adults have been found on Lonicera species.

References

External links
Lepiforum e. V.

Moths described in 1775
Elachistidae
Moths of Europe
Moths of Asia